Gutach (Low Alemannic: Guetich im Brisgau) is a municipality in the district of Emmendingen in Baden-Württemberg in Germany.

Gutach includes six villages:
 Gutach
 Bleibach
 Siegelau
 Stollen
 Kregelbach
 Oberspitzenbach

Twin towns
 Worthing, United Kingdom

External links 

 Official website of the municipality

References

Emmendingen (district)
Black Forest
Municipalities in Baden-Württemberg
Ortenaukreis